John Norton may refer to:

Politicians
Sir John Norton, 3rd Baronet (1620–1687), British MP for Hampshire
John Norton (journalist) (1858–1916), Australian journalist and politician
John Norton (MP for Sandwich), (1406–1407), British MP for Sandwich
John E. Norton, American politician from Wisconsin
John N. Norton (1878–1960), American politician from Nebraska
John R. Norton III (1929–2016), American farmer and politician
John T. Norton (1865–1942), American lawyer and politician from New York

Sports
John Norton (athlete) (1893–1979), American athlete in track and field and Olympic medalist
John Norton (water polo) (1899–1987), American water polo player and Olympic medalist

Others
John Norton, 5th Baron Grantley (1855–1943), British peer and numismatist
Rev. John Norton, founding pastor of Old Ship Church in Hingham, Massachusetts
John Norton (academic) (died 1462), English churchman and chancellor of New College, Oxford
John Norton (architect) (1823–1904), English Victorian Gothic revivalist who remodelled Tyntesfield
John Norton (author) (1936–2015), American poet and fiction writer
John Norton (bishop) (1891–1963), Australian Roman Catholic bishop and Diocese of Bathurst
John Norton (divine) (1606–1663), English Puritan divine and one of the first authors in British North America
John Norton (Mohawk chief) (born c. 1760), Native American who played a prominent role in the War of 1812
John Norton (priest) (1840–1920), Anglican priest in Canada
John Norton (soldier) (1918–2004), United States Army general and co-founder of the US Army Air Corps
John Bruce Norton (1815–1883), British lawyer and educationist
John D. Norton (born 1953), Australian professor of the history and philosophy of science at the University of Pittsburgh
John Henry Norton (1855–1923), Australian Roman Catholic bishop of Port Augusta
John Pitkin Norton (1822–1852), American educator, agricultural chemist, and author who taught at Yale University
John W. Norton (1876–1934), American muralist

See also
Jonathan Norton (born 1958), American drummer and singer
Jack Norton (1882–1958), actor
Jack Norton (filmmaker) (born 1980), American filmmaker and children's musician
John Morton (disambiguation)
John Player Norton, motorbikes manufactured by Norton and sponsored by John Player